Adrian Paul Hardy  (born August 16, 1970) is a former American football defensive back who played three seasons in the National Football League (NFL) with the San Francisco 49ers and Cincinnati Bengals. He was drafted by the 49ers in the second round of the 1993 NFL Draft. Hardy played college football at Northwestern State University and attended Redeemer-Seton High School in New Orleans Louisiana. He was a member of the San Francisco 49ers team that won Super Bowl XXIX.

References

External links
Just Sports Stats
Fanbase profile

Living people
1970 births
Players of American football from New Orleans
American football defensive backs
African-American players of American football
Northwestern State Demons football players
San Francisco 49ers players
Cincinnati Bengals players
21st-century African-American sportspeople
20th-century African-American sportspeople